The 1955 Sacramento State Hornets football team represented Sacramento State College—now known as California State University, Sacramento—as a member of the Far Western Conference (FWC) during the 1955 college football season. Led by second-year head coach Dave Strong, Sacramento State compiled an overall record of 2–6 with a mark of 0–5 in conference play, placing last out of six tams in the FWC. After going winless in their first season, in 1954, the Hornets won their first game ever in the 1955 opener against . For the season the team was outscored by its opponents 176 to 70. The Hornets played home games at Grant Stadium in Sacramento, California.

Schedule

References

Sacramento State
Sacramento State Hornets football seasons
Sacramento State Hornets football